Two foot and 600 mm gauge railways are narrow gauge railways with track gauges of  and , respectively.

Overview

Most of these lines are tourist lines, which are often heritage railways or industrial lines, such as the Ffestiniog Railway in Wales and the Cripple Creek and Victor Narrow Gauge Railroad in Colorado.

World War I trench railways produced the greatest concentration of  gauge railways to date. In preparation for World War II, the French Maginot Line and Alpine Line also used  gauge railways for supply routes to the fixed border defenses.

Many  gauge and  gauge railways are used in amusement parks and theme parks worldwide.

Exchange of rolling stock 
The interchange of rolling stock between these similar track gauges occasionally occurred; for example, the South African Class NG15 2-8-2 locomotives started their career on the  gauge. The Otavi Mining and Railway Company in South West Africa (now Namibia) were transferred to the 2 ft gauge railways in South Africa and currently some surviving locomotives reside in Wales on the  gauge Welsh Highland Railway and the  gauge Brecon Mountain Railway.

Railways

See also

Decauville
Heritage railway
Large amusement railways
List of track gauges
 Minimum gauge railway

References